Joseph Fessio  (born January 10, 1941) is an American Jesuit priest as well as the founder and editor of Ignatius Press. He served as the founding provost of Ave Maria University until March 2007.

Life
Fessio attended high school at Bellarmine College Preparatory in San Jose, California, from 1954 to 1958. He took afterwards undergraduate studies in civil engineering at the University of Santa Clara, California. He entered the Jesuit novitiate on September 7, 1961. Before his ordination to the priesthood, he earned a B.A (in 1966) and an M.A. (in 1967) in Philosophy from Gonzaga University in Spokane, Washington. He also earned an M.A in Theology from his studies in Lyon, France. He was ordained a priest on June 10, 1972.

In 1975, he earned his doctorate in theology from the University of Regensburg, West Germany. His thesis director was Joseph Ratzinger, the future-Pope Benedict XVI. The subject of his thesis was The Ecclesiology of Hans Urs von Balthasar.

Ecclesiastical and professional career
From 1966 - 1974 Fessio taught philosophy and theology at Gonzaga University and at the University of Santa Clara and University of San Francisco in California. In 1976 he founded the St. Ignatius Institute at the University of San Francisco, and in 1978 he founded and became the first editor of Ignatius Press. In the following year he became the director of Religious Books on Tape, the audio division of Ignatius Press, until 1987 when he was fired from his position as Director by Father President, John LoSchiavo, S.J., in a dispute over management of a $1,000,000 donation.

In 1987 he was a Peritus at the Seventh Ordinary General Assembly of Bishops, held at the Vatican, and delivered a paper arguing that girls and women should be excluded from the offices of altar server and lector at the Catholic Mass.

He was the editor of 30 Days, In the Church and the World, from 1988 to 1991, and in 1991 became the publisher of the Catholic World Report. In 1995 he was the publisher of Catholic Dossier, Catholic Faith, and Homiletic & Pastoral Review.

In 1995 he co-founded "Adoremus", the Society for the Renewal of the Sacred Liturgy.

In 1998 he founded the Catholic Radio Network.

In March 2002, he founded Campion College of San Francisco. However, that same month Thomas Smolich, the provincial superior of the Jesuits in California, ordered him to disassociate from the college and to serve as a hospital chaplain in Duarte, California, although he retained leadership of Ignatius Press.

In 2002, after public outcry about his treatment by his superior, Smolich allowed Fessio to become chancellor at Ave Maria University.

In 2007, he was fired from his position as provost of Ave Maria University over "irreconcilable differences over administrative policies and practices". He was reinstated as a theologian in residence the next day, and remained a supporter of the university. In 2009, he was fired from his faculty position at the university after expressing concern regarding the university's financial situation due to certain policies of the administration.

References

External links
Ave Maria University
Ignatius Press
Video: Father Fessio on the Motu Proprio Summorum Pontificum

1941 births
Living people
American people of Italian descent
American magazine publishers (people)
American Roman Catholic priests
Gonzaga University alumni
Santa Clara University alumni
University of Regensburg alumni
Ave Maria University
20th-century American Jesuits
21st-century American Jesuits
Pope Benedict XVI